In electrical engineering, a circulator is a passive, non-reciprocal three- or four-port device that only allows a microwave or radio-frequency signal to exit through the port directly after the one it entered. Optical circulators have similar behavior. Ports are where an external waveguide or transmission line, such as a microstrip line or a coaxial cable, connects to the device. For a three-port circulator, a signal applied to port 1 only comes out of port 2; a signal applied to port 2 only comes out of port 3; a signal applied to port 3 only comes out of port 1, and so on. An ideal three-port circulator has the following scattering matrix:

Types

Depending on the materials involved, circulators fall into two main categories: ferrite circulators and nonferrite circulators.

Ferrite
Ferrite circulators are radio-frequency circulators which employ magnetized microwave ferrite materials. They fall into two main classes: differential phase shift circulators and junction circulators, both of which are based on cancellation of waves propagating over two different paths in or near magnetized ferrite material. Waveguide circulators may be of either type, while more compact devices based on stripline are usually of the junction type.  Two or more junction circulators can be combined in a single component to give four or more ports. Typically permanent magnets produce a static magnetic bias in the microwave ferrite material. Ferrimagnetic garnet crystal is used in optical circulators.

Junction type stripline circulators utilize two ferrite disks above and below the stripline. These ferrites are circularly magnetized in opposite directions. They form two separate resonators with the stripline disk between them. The static magnetic bias alters the effective permeabilities in the top and bottom ferrites. The ferrite whose circular magnetization is in the same direction as the resultant electron spin precession, will see a permeability increase. The ferrite that is magnetized opposite the electron spin precession will see a permeability decrease. These changing permeabilities result in resonant frequency shifts of the two resonators previously mentioned. The operating frequency is set between the two resonances such that the impedance angle of both resonators is set to 30 degrees (for a three port implementation). The ferrite with the higher permeability will have a higher resonance frequency and an inductive reactance component. The lower permeability ferrite has a lower resonance and capacitive reactance component. These circulator types operate based on faraday rotation. Wave cancellation occurs when waves propagate with and against the circulation direction. An incident wave arriving at any port is split equally into two waves. They propagate in each direction around the circulator with different phase velocities. When they arrive at the output port they have different phase relationships and thus combine accordingly. This combination of waves propagating at different phase velocities is how junction circulators fundamentally operate. 

Though ferrite circulators can provide good "forward" signal circulation while suppressing greatly the "reverse" circulation, their major shortcomings, especially at low frequencies, are the bulky sizes and the narrow bandwidths.

Nonferrite
Early work on nonferrite circulators includes active circulators using transistors that are non-reciprocal in nature. In contrast to ferrite circulators which are passive devices, active circulators require power. Major issues associated with transistor-based active circulators are the power limitation and the signal-to-noise degradation, which are critical when it is used as a duplexer for sustaining the strong transmit power and clean reception of the signal from the antenna.

Varactors offer one solution. One study employed a structure similar to a time-varying transmission line with the effective nonreciprocity triggered by a one-direction propagating carrier pump. This is like an AC-powered active circulator. The research claimed to be able to achieve positive gain and low noise for receiving path and broadband nonreciprocity. Another study used resonance with nonreciprocity triggered by angular-momentum biasing, which more closely mimics the way that signals passively circulate in a ferrite circulator.

In 1964, Mohr presented and experimentally demonstrated a circulator based on transmission lines and switches. In April, 2016 a research team significantly extended this concept, presenting an integrated circuit circulator based on N-path filter concepts. It offers the potential for full-duplex communication (transmitting and receiving at the same time with a single shared antenna over a single frequency). The device uses capacitors and a clock and is much smaller than conventional devices.

Applications

Isolator
When one port of a three-port circulator is terminated in a matched load, it can be used as an isolator, since a signal can travel in only one direction between the remaining ports. An isolator is used to shield equipment on its input side from the effects of conditions on its output side; for example, to prevent a microwave source being detuned by a mismatched load.

Duplexer
In radar, circulators are used as a type of duplexer, to route signals from the transmitter to the antenna and from the antenna to the receiver, without allowing signals to pass directly from transmitter to receiver. The alternative type of duplexer is a transmit-receive switch (TR switch) that alternates between connecting the antenna to the transmitter and to the receiver. The use of chirped pulses and a high dynamic range may lead to temporal overlap of the sent and received pulses, however, requiring a circulator for this function.

Reflection amplifier

A reflection amplifier is a type of microwave amplifier circuit utilizing negative differential resistance diodes such as tunnel diodes and Gunn diodes. Negative differential resistance diodes can amplify signals, and often perform better at microwave frequencies than two-port devices.  However, since the diode is a one-port (two terminal) device, a nonreciprocal component is needed to separate the outgoing amplified signal from the incoming input signal. By using a 3-port circulator with the signal input connected to one port, the biased diode connected to a second, and the output load connected to the third, the output and input can be uncoupled.

References

Further reading

External links
 Circulators and Isolators
 RF Circulators what they are, different types, how they work, etc.

Microwave technology
Radio technology
Telecommunications equipment